Schizochirus insolens, the brokenfin sandburrower, is a species of sandburrower native to the coastal waters and bays of eastern Australia from Rockhampton, Queensland to Sydney.  This species grows to a length of  SL.  This species is the only known member of its genus.

References

brokenfin sandburrower
Marine fish of Eastern Australia
brokenfin sandburrower
Taxa named by Edgar Ravenswood Waite